Penske Truck Leasing Co., L.P. is a joint venture of Penske Corporation, Penske Automotive Group, and Mitsui & Co. Headquartered in Reading, Pennsylvania, the company was founded by Team Penske owner Roger Penske on December 1, 1969.  The firm serves customers in North America, South America, Europe, Asia, and Australia; among its services are full-service commercial truck leasing, truck fleet maintenance, truck rentals, and used truck sales. The company currently employs more than 36,000 workers worldwide and operates and maintains a fleet of more than 300,000 vehicles. Brian Hard is the president and CEO of the company. 

Of note, Penske Truck Leasing has been investing in and expanding its fleet of commercial electric trucks and adding electric truck charging stations infrastructure to its locations. 

In September 2017, General Electric sold the last of its stake in Penske for $674 million. The 15.5% stake was purchased by Penske and a subsidiary of Mitsui.

Subsidiaries and units

Penske Truck Rental 

Penske Truck Rental is an operating unit of Penske Truck Leasing that has more than 2,500 consumer truck rental locations across the United States and Canada. Penske rents commercial semi-trucks, straight trucks and semi-trailers to businesses that haul freight. Its truck rental fleet has more than 85,000 units. In addition, the business unit also rents trucks ranging from 12 feet in length to 26 feet in length to consumers for do-it-yourself moves that are either local moves or one-way moves. Penske's commercial and consumer rental vehicles are typically branded bright yellow with black lettering and blue stripes.

Penske Logistics
Penske Logistics is a wholly owned subsidiary of Penske Truck Leasing that has operations in North America, South America, Europe, and Asia. Penske Logistics provides supply chain management and logistics services such as dedicated carriage, distribution center management, transportation management, lead logistics, supply chain consulting, and freight brokerage services. Penske Logistics had 2018 revenues of $2.3 billion and is ranked among the top 20 for-hire trucking companies by industry publication Transport Topics. This subsidiary is also headquartered in Reading, Pennsylvania. Marc Althen is the president of Penske Logistics. 

Penske Logistics made two notable acquisitions in the last few years including that of Transfreight North America from Mitsui  in 2015 and the acquisition of Greensboro, N.C.-based EPES Transport Systems in 2018. Both acquisitions were private transactions. 

Of note, Penske Logistics completed construction and opened a 606,000-square-foot refrigerated regional distribution center in Romulus, Michigan in June 2019.

Penske Used Trucks
Penske Used Trucks is an operating unit of Penske Truck Leasing that sells off-lease trucks, semi-trucks, trailers, and other trucking-related equipment directly to businesses and to the used truck wholesale marketplace. This unit sells semi-tractors, semi-trailers, straight trucks, and other equipment for light-, medium-, and heavy-duty transportation applications.

Sponsorship
In the 2009 IndyCar Series, Will Power drove four races for Team Penske with 
Penske Truck Leasing sponsorship. Teammate Hélio Castroneves had Penske Truck Leasing sponsorship for three races in 2011 and seven races in 2012. Simon Pagenaud carried Penske Truck Leasing sponsorship for eight races in the 2015 IndyCar Series.

See also
Penske Corporation
List of assets owned by General Electric
Joint venture

References

External links

Penske Truck Leasing website

Truck Leasing
Truck rental
Companies based in Reading, Pennsylvania
Transport companies established in 1969
1969 establishments in Pennsylvania
Joint ventures
General Electric Industrial subsidiaries
Mitsui & Co.